Hubbard is an unincorporated community in Bowie County, Texas, United States. According to the Handbook of Texas, the community had a population of 269 in 2000. It is part of the Texarkana metropolitan area.

History
The community was most likely named for early settler Richard B. Hubbard. The oldest graves in the Hubbard Chapel Cemetery date as far back as 1835. There was a church, a cemetery, and several scattered houses in Hubbard in 1936. Its population was recorded as 269 from 1990 through 2000.

Geography

Education
Hubbard had its own school in 1936. The Hubbard Independent School District as well as the DeKalb Independent School District serves area students.

References

Unincorporated communities in Texas
Unincorporated communities in Bowie County, Texas
Texarkana metropolitan area